Mary Beth Marley (born May 19, 1995) is an American pair skater. With former partner Rockne Brubaker, she is the 2012 Four Continents bronze medalist and 2012 U.S. silver medalist. Previously, Marley competed in single skating and became the 2009 U.S. novice silver medalist.

Career

Singles career 
Marley won the novice silver medal at the 2009 U.S. Championships. She was 5th on the junior level in 2011.

Partnership with Brubaker 
Marley and Brubaker teamed up after a two-day tryout in August 2010. She was previously a singles skater and had no pairs experience but passed her pairs test on August 31, 2010. The pair was coached by John Nicks. Marley relocated to Aliso Viejo, California. 

Marley and Brubaker's first international competition was the Toruń Cup in Toruń, Poland, where they earned the minimum technical scores required to compete at an ISU Championship. They placed fourth at the 2011 U.S. Nationals and were named as alternates for Four Continents. They were assigned to the event after an injury led Caydee Denney and Jeremy Barrett to withdraw. Jenni Meno and Todd Sand became their main coaches for the 2011–12 season and Nicks also continued to work with the pair.

In the 2012–2013 season, Marley and Brubaker were assigned to 2012 Skate Canada International and 2012 NHK Trophy, however, on August 14, 2012, the pair announced the end of their partnership. Marley decided to step away from competitive figure skating She works as a coach and choreographer in Chicago.

Programs

With Brubaker

As singles skater

Competitive highlights

Pairs career with Brubaker

Singles career

References

External links 

 
 Mary Beth Marley / Rockne Brubaker at Ice Network
 Mary Beth Marley at Ice Network

1995 births
American female pair skaters
Sportspeople from Naperville, Illinois
Sportspeople from Aliso Viejo, California
Living people
Four Continents Figure Skating Championships medalists
20th-century American women
21st-century American women